This is a list of all cathedrals in Wales, both anglican Church in Wales cathedrals, and the roman catholic cathedrals of the Roman Catholic Archdiocese of Cardiff.

Church in Wales 
There are six dioceses of Wales with a Bishop for each diocese of the Church in Wales. The Archbishop of Wales is elected by the Electoral College from amongst the six Welsh diocesan bishops. The first Archbishop of Wales was enthroned in 1920.

The Welsh Church Act 1914 caused the Church of England to be disestablished in Wales and Monmouthshire in 1920, and allowed the establishment of the Church in Wales and enthronement of the first Archbishop of Wales in the same year. The act introduction states, "An Act to terminate the establishment of the Church of England in Wales and Monmouthshire, and to make provision in respect of the Temporalities thereof, and for other purposes in connection with the matters aforesaid."

Roman Catholic Church 
The Catholic Church in Wales is divided into three dioceses; the Diocese of Wrexham, the Diocese of Menevia and the Archdiocese of Cardiff. Together these dioceses make up the Catholic Provence of Cardiff. 

The Archdiocese of Cardiff includes 78 churches including Cardiff cathedral. 70 of these churches are in south east Wales and 8 churches in Herefordshire, England. The Catholic Bishops' Conference of England and Wales is a permanent assembly of Catholic Bishops and Personal Ordinaries in the two member countries of Wales and England.

See also 
 Religion in Wales
 List of cities in Wales
 Christianity in Wales
 List of cities in Wales
 List of monastic houses in Wales

References

External links 

 
Wales
 Cathedrals